USCGC McLane (WSC-146) was a  United States Coast Guard Active-class patrol boat in commission from 1927 to 1971. She was named for Louis McLane, (1786–1857) who was appointed in 1833 as United States Secretary of State. In May 1966, she was redesignated as (WMEC-146).

Development and design 
Alert-class ships were designed for trailing "mother ships" along the outer line of patrol during Prohibition. They were constructed at a cost of $63,173 each. They gained a reputation for durability that was only enhanced by their re-engining in the late 1930s; their original 6-cylinder diesel engines were replaced by significantly more powerful 8-cylinder units that used the original engine beds and gave the vessels an additional  of speed. Ten were refitted as buoy tenders during the war and reverted to patrol work afterward.

Originally designated WPC, for patrol craft, they were re-designated WSC, for submarine chaser, in February 1942, during World War II. The "W" appended to the PC (patrol craft) and SC (submarine chaser) designations identified vessels as belonging to the U.S. Coast Guard. Those remaining in service in May 1966 were reclassified as medium endurance cutters (WMEC).

Construction and commissioning 
McLane was laid down and launched by American Brown Boveri Electric Corporation, Camden on 22 March 1927. She was commissioned on 6 April 1927.

Service history

When the United States entered World War II in December 1941, operational control of U.S. Coast Guard ships, including McLane, was transferred from the United States Department of the Treasury to the United States Navy. The Coast Guard did not return to Department of the Treasury control until 1946. Throughout World War II, McLane patrolled in the waters of the Territory of Alaska including the Bering Strait.

While on patrol in Dixon Entrance between Alaska and British Columbia on 7 June 1942, McLane received a report of an Imperial Japanese Navy submarine sighted in the area and began a search for it. The Coast Guard-manned U.S. Navy patrol vessel  and the Royal Canadian Navy minesweeper  joined McLane on 9 July 1942, and the three ships began a search for the submarine in Dixon Entrance southeast of Annette Island in Southeast Alaska. McLane reported that she gained sound contact on a submarine at 0800, but then lost it, and a depth charge she dropped set to explode at a depth of  failed to detonate. She regained sound contact at 0905 and chased the submarine for an hour, McLane reporting that the submarine zigzagged and ran at short intervals to try to evade her, and after an hour she again lost contact. McLane and YP-251 reported that bubbles rose to the surface. The vessels reported that a torpedo passed ahead of McLane and only  astern of YP-251 at 1735, leaving a  feather that indicated the submarine's firing position, which McLane turned toward. YP-251 reported that she sighted a periscope and dropped a depth charge over the spot where the periscope submerged, and McLane followed up that attack with two depth charges of her own. McLane then attempted to regain sonar contact on the submarine. The vessels reported that an oil slick rose to the surface, and at 1935 YP-251 reported sighting a periscope, dropped a depth charge, and struck a submerged object, which she rode over. McLane then dropped two depth charges, after which the vessels reported that oil, bubbles, and what appeared to be rock wool (used to deaden sounds in submarines) rose to the surface. McLane continued to search the area for any sign of the submarine until early on the morning of 10 July 1942, but found none. The commanding officers of the two vessels — and Lieutenant Ralph Burns, USCG, of McLane and Lieutenant Neils P. Thomsen, USCG, of YP-251,  received the Legion of Merit for the action, and in 1947 the Joint Army-Navy Assessment Committee identified the sunken submarine as the Japanese submarine . In 1967, however, the U.S. Navy determined that Ro-32 had been inactive in Japan at the time of the sinking and had remained afloat through the end of World War II, and the identity of the submarine reportedly sunk on 9 July 1942 remains undetermined.

McLane rescued the crew of a downed Lockheed Model 10 Electra in February 1943.

In May 1966, McLane was reclassified as a medium endurance cutter and redesignated WMEC-146. She was decommissioned on 31 December 1968.  She then became a training ship for the Sea Scouts.

McLane was donated to the Great Lakes Naval Memorial and Museum in Muskegon, Michigan, in 1993 and is preserved there as a museum ship. She is berthed behind the submarine .

Awards
 American Defense Service Medal
 American Campaign Medal
 Asiatic-Pacific Campaign Medal with battle star
 World War II Victory Medal
 National Defense Service Medal with star

See also 
Rum Patrol

Notes

Citations

Sources 

Bruhn, David D. Battle Stars for the "Cactus Navy": America's Fishing Vessels and Yachts in World War II. Berwyn Heights, Maryland: Heritage Books 2014.

Websites 

 
 
 
 

Active-class patrol boats
1927 ships
Ships built in Camden, New Jersey
World War II patrol vessels of the United States
Ships of the United States Coast Guard
Museum ships in Michigan
Brown, Boveri & Cie